This article provides a list of genetic engineering software.

Cloud-based freemium software
 Varstation NGS variants processing and analysis tool
 BaseSpace Variant Interpreter by Illumina

Closed-source software
 BlueTractorSoftware DNADynamo
 Agilent Technologies RFLP Decoder Software, Fish Species
 Applied Biosystems GeneMapper
 Joint BioEnergy Institute j5
 CLC bio CLC DNA Workbench Software
 CLC bio CLC Free Workbench Software
 CLC bio CLC Sequence Viewer
 CLC bio Protein Workbench Software
 DNASTAR Lasergene
 Geneious
 LabVantage Solutions Inc. LabVantage Sapphire
 LabVantage Solutions Inc. LV LIMS
 SnapGene
 The GeneRecommender

Open-source software
Autodesk Genetic Constructor (suspended)
BIOFAB Clotho BIOFAB Edition
 BIOFAB BIOFAB Studio
 EGF Codons and EGF CUBA (Collection of Useful Biological Apps) by the Edinburgh Genome Foundry
 Integrative Genomics Viewer (part of Google Genomics)
 Mengqvist's DNApy

See also
 Geppetto (3D engine); an open-source 3D engine for genetic engineering-related functions;also used in the OpenWorm project

Software
E
Genetic